Pandour was a French a 14-gun gun-brig launched in 1780 as a cutter. The Royal Navy captured her in December 1795 and  took her into service as Pandora (or Pandour), but she foundered in June 1797.

French service and capture
Jacques and Daniel Denys built Pandour as a cutter at Dunkirk in 1780 and launched her on 16 June. She took part in the Battle of Fort Royal on 29 April and 30 April 1781.

In 1782 she was re-rigged as a brig at Brest. In 1786, she was attached to a division comprising Experiment, Boulonnaise and Rossignol, cruising off the coasts of Africa.

From 1787 to 1790, she was in the Far-East.

In 1792 she was under the command of Lieutenant Bertrand de Keranguen. His successor in 1793 as commander was enseigne de vaisseau non-entretenu Hardouin, later promoted to lieutenant de vaisseau. Pandour was based out of Dunkirk and cruised in the North Sea, going as far as Bergen.

 captured Pandour on 1 December 1795. Caroline was part of Admiral Lord Duncan's squadron in the North Sea and when two strange vessels were spotted, Duncan signaled to Caroline to pursue. After about four and half hours and some pro forma exchange of fire, Caroline captured Pandour of fourteen 6-pounder guns and 108 men. She was three days out of Dunkirk. The other French vessel escaped while Caroline was securing her prisoners. The second vessel was the Septnie, of twelve 4-pounder guns. When prize money was awarded, Caroline shared it with the other ships of the squadron.

British service and loss
The Royal Navy had Pandora fitted and coppered at Deptford between January 1796 and 6 May. Lieutenant Samuel Mason commissioned Pandora in September. She disappeared in the North Sea in June 1797, and was presumed to have foundered with the loss of all hands.

Notes

Citations

References
 
 
 
 
 
 
 
  
 

1780 ships
Brigs of the Royal Navy
Captured ships
Maritime incidents in 1797
Ships built in France
Brigs of the French Navy
Missing ships
Warships lost with all hands
Shipwrecks in the North Sea
Cutters of the French Navy
Mutin-class cutters